The University of Wisconsin–La Crosse Eagles (casually known as the UW–La Crosse Eagles) are the athletic teams of the University of Wisconsin–La Crosse. The Eagles athletic teams compete in at the NCAA Division III as a member of the Wisconsin Intercollegiate Athletic Conference (WIAC). Wisconsin–La Crosse's teams were known as the Indians from 1937 to 1989. The name was changed because of concerns of racial insensitivity regarding Native Americans; see Native American mascot controversy.

National championships

Team

Individual teams

Football
 
The Eagles football team plays its home games at Veterans Memorial Stadium. The football program has won three national titles: the NAIA Division II Football National Championship in 1985 and NCAA Division III Football Championship in 1992 and 1995, all during the tenure of Roger Harring, who served as head coach from 1969 to 1999 and was inducted into the College Football Hall of Fame in 2005.

Track and field
The Eagles have won 18 team titles at the NCAA Division III Men's Indoor Track and Field Championships and 15 team titles at the NCAA Division III Men's Outdoor Track and Field Championships. Both totals are the best in Division III history.

Notable athletes
 Jerry Augustine, MLB player
 Will Berzinski, NFL player
 Ben Braun, college basketball coach
 Roman Brumm, NFL player
 Mike Dee, college baseball coach at University of Illinois at Chicago
 Brian Gutekunst, NFL General Manager, Green Bay Packers
 Don Iverson, professional golfer on the PGA Tour
 Don Kindt, Jr., NFL player
 Tom Klawitter, MLB player
 Craig Kusick, baseball player
 Craig Kusick, Jr., Arena Football League quarterback
 Ace Loomis, NFL player
 Mike Maslowski, National Football League (NFL) linebacker
 Ric Mathias, NFL player
 Greg Mattison, NCAA and NFL football coach
 Neal Nelson, Hall of Fame basketball coach
 Tom Newberry, NFL offensive Lineman
 Vinny Rottino, MLB player
 Bill Schroeder, 1994, NFL wide receiver
 Webb Schultz, MLB player
 Ed Servais, college baseball coach at Saint Mary's and Creighton
 Ellen Tronnier, All-American Girls Professional Baseball League player
 Jeremy Unertl, Arena Football League player
 Joel Williams, NFL linebacker

References

External links